Maria da Felicidade do Couto Browne (10 January 1797 – 8 or 9 November 1861) was a Portuguese woman poet.

Life 
Felicidade do Couto Browne was born in Porto, Portugal. She married Manuel Clamouse Browne, a wealthy port wine merchant of Irish and French descent. They had a daughter, Júlia, who married the Viscount of Vilarinho de São Romão Álvaro Ferreira Teixeira Carneiro de Vasconcelos Girão. Felicidade do Couto Browne died in Porto on either 8 or 9 November, 1861.

Career 
In order to be published and reviewed without bias, Felicidade do Couto Browne used the pseudonyms 'A Coruja Trovador (The Troubadour Owl)' and 'Sóror Dolores', both of which she also used as titles of her works. Felicidade do Couto Browne's works enjoyed widespread attention amidst Porto´s society of the time. She collaborated with the periodicals O Nacional, Miscelânea Política and Eugénio Tavares's Almanaque de Lembranças Luso-Brasileiro. Felicidade do Couto Browne also established a literary salon for writers, which included Arnaldo Gama Luís de Magalhães, Ricardo Guimarães, and Camilo Castelo Branco.

Legacy 
Two streets have been named after her in Carnide, Lisbon, and in São Domingos de Rana, Cascais.

Works 
1849 – Sóror Dolores
1854 – A Coruja Trovadora (The Troubadour Owl)
1854 – Virações da Madrugada (Breeze of Dawn)
1854 – Sonetos e Poesias Líricas (Sonnets and Lyrics)

References 

1797 births
1861 deaths
19th-century Portuguese poets
19th-century women writers
Portuguese women poets
People from Porto
19th-century Portuguese people